For many years, LGBT representation increased on animated series and animated films. In the 1990s, LGBT characters were depicted in animated series like South Park, The Ambiguously Gay Duo, and The Simpsons. In the early 2000s, LGBT representation increased in Western animation, culminating in GLAAD's "Where We Are in TV" report in 2005, even as representation in such animation was scattered and disparate. In  the 2000s, series like Queer Duck, The Oblongs, The Venture Bros., Drawn Together, and Archer would air. It would not be until the advent of shows like Steven Universe, The Legend of Korra, and Adventure Time in the 2010s, that LGBT characters in animation would gain more of a prominent role, leading to shows such as She-Ra and the Princesses of Power in 2018 and Kipo and the Age of Wonderbeasts in 2020, along with other series in the 2020s. This page will show this progress by building off the lists of animated series which contain these characters and explain the History of LGBT characters in animation. It does not focus on LGBT characters in anime series or films, which is examined on the LGBT themes in anime and manga page.

Trends
Gender has always been a component of animation, with scholars Harry Benshoff and Sean Griffin writing that animation has always "hint[ed] at the performative nature of gender." They specifically cite the example of Bugs Bunny wearing a wig and a dress, acting as a female rabbit in drag. Some argued that the Walt Disney Company played with gender stereotypes in the past, featuring effeminate or "sissy" characters, or those coded as gay, which occurred while the characters were comedic and kept at arms length. 

In the 1990s, characters on Fox and Comedy Central shows comprised most of the LGBT characters on television. Shows like The Simpsons and South Park especially would be influential on other adult animations in the years to come.

There was under-representation of gay characters through the Fall 2000 television season for all broadcast shows, with trend continuing until at least 2003. It would not be until 2005 that GLAAD would began their annual “Where We Are on TV” report" starting its continuing effort to compile statistics on characters in the LGBT community, and other marginalized groups. GLAAD, for their part, bemoaned the lack of LGBT representation. They noted in the regular 2006–2007 season, LGBT characters only comprised 1.3% of all regular characters on major broadcast networks (NBC, CBS, ABC, Fox, The CW, and UPN). 

In a report the next year, they noted in the 2007–2008 season, the FOX network only featured LGBT characters in animated comedies like The Simpsons and American Dad. In 2008, GLAAD assessed the "considerable" LGBT representation in animated primetime programming," citing shows such as The Simpsons, American Dad, Sit Down, Shut Up, The Goode Family, Rick & Steve: The Happiest Gay Couple in All the World, and Drawn Together,  even as they had their reservations about existing LGBT characters on television. In later years, GLAAD painted a bleaker picture, noting that no black LGBT characters were regular characters on television networks, again noting American Dad, The Simpsons, and Rick & Steve: The Happiest Gay Couple in All the World. They stated that most animated LGBT characters were on FOX, lamenting that while South Park historically had LGBT characters and storylines, it could be "hit or miss" like Family Guy.

In 2014, GLAAD would comment that "children's programming has been slow to reflect the diversity its audience is experiencing in its daily life." In 2015, GLAAD expanded their analysis to include LGBT characters on stream services like Amazon and Netflix for the first time. In 2016, GLAAD reported that the highest number of LGBT characters they had recorded yet appeared in the 2016–2017 television season. 

In 2017, GLAAD praised the increase of LGBT characters on streaming services like Amazon, Netflix, and Hulu. While GLAAD and others were praising the growth in the number of LGBT characters in broadcast, primetime television, some reported that LGBT characters in animated television were somewhat rare. 

In 2018, GLAAD noted that while Netflix was featuring more LGBT people of color, including CW Seed launching two shows with "queer heroes" and how Bojack Horseman expanding the story of Todd, the "only asexual character on streaming originals" as they described it. In 2018 and 2019, GLAAD said that Amazon, Hulu, and Netflix, had increased LGBT representation in "daytime kids and family television." 

In May 2019, Ashley Fetters and Natalie Escobar argued, in The Atlantic that the episode of Arthur where two male characters got married "marks a poignant moment in children’s TV history," and that it feels "unremarkable." They said this is the case because you can "count on your fingers the number of kids’ shows that have depicted gay characters," including Adventure Time, Steven Universe, The Legend of Korra, Gravity Falls, Clarence, and The Loud House.

In 2020–2021 GLAAD report, DuckTales was described as featuring two dads in an episode, with some episodes centering on "an alien named Penumbra" who the episodes' director and writer confirmed as a lesbian, and the show The Owl House was noted as making headlines for a bisexual character named Luz, and her crush, Amity, who is lesbian, who have a "romantic storyline." Additionally, GLAAD described The Loud House as featuring Luna Loud, a bisexual character, and Summy, her girlfriend, along with Howard and Harold McBride, "the two Dads of the protagonist’s best friend Clyde." 

GLAAD pointed to a few series on the platform like Harley Quinn, with Harley Quinn as bisexual and had a growing relationship with Poison Ivy, Doom Patrol which has a gay man named Larry Trainor/Negative Man and a character, Danny, who uses they/them pronouns, and Young Justice which features "LGBT characters Aqualad and Halo." GLAAD also pointed out that the streamer aired an episode of Adventure Time: Distant Lands which focuses "on queer couple Bubblegum and Marceline" and the announcement that an animated series based on Lumberjanes was ordered. It is worth noting that Young Justice is a young adult animation, while Doom Patrol is for adults and Adventure Time: Distant Lands is for all-ages.

Up to the 1990s 

On July 27, 1940, Bugs Bunny premiered in the Warner Brothers Cartoon, A Wild Hare. Bugs Bunny would later be described as the "first animated drag queen" due to the character's propensity to cross-dress in women's clothing in at least 40 cartoons. The creators thought the cross-dressing was "funny," with the cross-dressing positively received by audiences. Even so, the Hays Code was still enforced in the United States, which banned curse words, forbid interracial relationships to be depicted, and had a "puritanical view of sex," replaced by a film rating system in 1968, with many of its "arbitrary moral guidelines" persisting for decades. One scholar stated however, that Bugs Bunny and Daffy Duck kiss male enemies so they can "humiliate and annoy them."

In 2010, animation and popular culture scholar Jo Johnson says that Bugs Bunny challenged the "signifiers of traditional masculinity" and argued that Looney Tunes pulls audiences challenges "the conventional notion of anatomy and gender." He also recounted that Bugs Bunny appeared in drag on "At least 45 separate occasions," and his gender ambiguity fluxes, showing masculinity and femininity at different times, even though he is clearly heterosexual. Johnson described shorts like "What's Opera, Doc?" as one of the most "subversive" because Bugs dresses as a woman through the majority of the animated short. In September 2021, Abbey White, a non-binary reporter for Insider and The Hollywood Reporter told in The Hollywood Reporter's "Hollywood Remixed" podcast that with Bugs Bunny you could have "a rabbit kiss a man, and that wouldn’t be considered this alarming thing" that would be censored or cut, and it was fine for Bugs Bunny to dress in drag because it was "meant as a form of comedy." 

One scholar, Jo Johnson, argued that Jerry in the Tom & Jerry cartoons had an androgynous design, even if feminized, and noted a possible homoerotic subtext between Jerry and Tom, especially when there is cross-dressing, like the notable 1945 short "Flirty Birdy" where the ending shows the Eagle marries Tom while in drag. Johnson pointed to the 1966 short "Jerry-Go-Round", by Chuck Jones, as having a coded same-sex relationship between Jerry, who was gendered by Jones as female, and a female elephant who wears a pink tutu. She argued that the episode's ending could be read as a "prophetic depiction of Gay Pride." Cade M. Olmstead, an interdisciplinary philosophy scholar, built upon Johnson's work. He argued that Tom and Jerry "subverts normalized gender and sexuality structures" through theatrical play and performance, transgressing the normal construction of gender.

Despite the queer coding in "Bugs Bunny" and "Tom & Jerry" cartoons, as scholars Deborah A. Fisher, Douglas L. Hill, Joel W. Grube, and Enid L. Gruber noted, before 1970, almost no gay characters were on television, and they remained relatively absent "until the 1990s." However, the 1983-1986 series, SuperTed, featured a gay character. Skeleton, one of Texas Pete's two henchmen, is a living skeleton who is cowardly and behaves in a campy and effeminate manner. Skeleton has the ability to put himself back together after falling apart. He was confirmed to be gay in a 2014 interview with series creator Mike Young.

Ursula the Sea Witch in the 1989 Disney film The Little Mermaid was inspired by Divine, a drag queen, with queer communities welcoming "her with open arms" despite that fact she was a villain. John Musker, a director of Moana, and co-director of The Little Mermaid, noted that Howard Ashman, a writer of the film, knew Devine and had one of the principal animators, Rob Menkoff, do drawings based on Devine. The other director of Moana (and a co-director of The Little Mermaid), Ron Clements, stated that it "just fit the character," while Musker called Ursula a "little mix of Divine and Joan Collins." Ashman was also, reportedly, a "big fan" of John Waters, and after the film, he got sick, as he was HIV positive, and he died from AIDS before he could accept the Academy Award for the music selection of Beauty and the Beast. Filmmaker Jeffrey Schwarz, who did a documentary on Divine, thought the film was pretty queer, while Sarah Ashman Gillespie, Ashman's sister, called the film "totally subversive." It was also revealed that earlier designs of Ursula were inspired by the singer Patti LaBelle, with Musker saying that in the early development art for the character, and Menkoff adding that they were "trying to get some of Divine's big, campy, overweight diva" into the design, which was incorporated into the final character. She was also described as  "Mae West of the deep sea" and the first plus-size icon in a Disney film. Akash Nikolas, a former editor for Zap2It, wrote, in a piece for The Atlantic, pointed to queer subtext and themes in The Little Mermaid, Beauty and the Beast, Pocahontas, Dumbo, Pinocchio, Aladdin, and Mulan, described Disney films as "both traditional and subversive," echoed by Hugh Ryan in Vice. A writer for The Mary Sue, Mandy Meyers, also argued that the movie's lesson changes if Ariel's journey is seen as a queer coming-of-age story  and interpreted through the romantic life of Hans Christian Andersen. In April 2020, animator Mark Scarnander re-imagined and re-animated Ariel as a gay man.

On December 17, 1989, the first episode of The Simpsons featured a gay character, Waylon Smithers, named after gay puppeteer Wayland Flowers, would appear on a U.S. animated show. However, like other shows at the time, The Simpsons approached the subject gingerly, not drawing much attention to  the sexuality of Smithers, as he remained in the closet, officially, until 2016. 

Erika Scheimer, daughter of Filmation founder Lou Scheimer, Erika had a role as the Assistant Recording Director for She-Ra: Princess of Power and voicing various characters, she ended up shaping "one of the biggest animated gay icons of all time": She-Ra, and felt comfortable working as a lesbian at Filmation. In a July 25, 2020 Comic Con panel with other LGBT comic writers, ND Stevenson, the showrunner of the reboot series, She-Ra and the Princesses of Power, argued that He-Man and She-Ra were gay icons in the original She-Ra series. She also stated that Netossa and Spinnerella were implied to be in a lesbian relationship and said that she saw gay themes throughout the series. In an interview with  ITV in February 2021, Stevenson said that "the original She-Ra was incredibly gay for a show made in 1987" and the crew who worked on the reboot series tried to incorporate the same themes.

1990s to present

In the 1990s, more LGBT characters began to be depicted in animated series, including in some Western animation like Futurama, South Park, and The Simpsons. Anime and Western animated shows built upon the representation of LGBT characters in the previous decade. The 2000s brought with it Queer Duck, the first animated TV series on U.S. television which featured homosexuality as a major theme, an alien named Roger in American Dad who had an ambiguous sexuality, and an assortment of other shows. 

The 2010s were a decade which would change LGBT representation in animation going forward in a significant way, especially in Western animation. The Legend of Korra's final episode implied that the main protagonist, Korra, began a relationship with another female character, Asami; this relationship was confirmed by the creators and was portrayed in the following comics. Vanity Fair , The Washington Post, USA Today, and other reviewers and commentors credit The Legend of Korra with paving the path for further queer representation.   In addition, the show Steven Universe, created by Rebecca Sugar, began airing on Cartoon Network in 2013, building upon her work on Adventure Time in the years prior. GLAAD highlighted LGBT characters in shows such as Archer, Allen Gregory, South Park, BoJack Horseman, DreamWorks Dragons, and Venture Bros. in their yearly "Where We Are in TV" reports. 2018 and 2019 would be particularly significant for LGBT representation. For example, the series finale of Adventure Time featured a kiss between two female characters (Princess Bubblegum and Marceline the Vampire Queen), the premiere of She-Ra and the Princesses of Power which includes various characters which could "read fluidly on the gender and sexuality spectrum", and the wedding between Ruby and Sapphire in Steven Universe.

Building on the progress in the 2010s, and anytime before, the 2020s held the promise of changing LGBT representation in animation in a significant way, especially when it came to Western animation. This went far and beyond anything in the 1990s or in the 2000s. In 2020 alone, the Steven Universe came to an end with the final episodes of Steven Universe Future, as did She-Ra and the Princesses of Power, with its final season bringing the slow-burn lesbian romance of Catra and Adora full circle with their kiss saving the world (and universe) from destruction. At the same time, The Hollow, DuckTales, and The Loud House, Harley Quinn, featured LGBT characters while Kipo and the Age of Wonderbeasts premiered with a canon gay character named Benson.

LGBT animals 
Fictional LGBT animals include Mr. Ratburn, an anthropomorphic rat who wed his partner Patrick in the 22nd season of the animated series Arthur.

Ursula, the octopus-inspired sea creature from The Little Mermaid, was inspired by Divine, an American actor, singer and drag queen. In 2019, Reiss Smith of PinkNews suggested drag performers Ginger Minj, Nina West, Peaches Christ, and Peppermint, as well as queer actor Tituss Burgess, could play Ursula in the Disney's upcoming remake of The Little Mermaid.

Sean Griffin, author or Tinker Belles and Evil Queens: The Walt Disney Company from the Inside Out, said Disney's cartoon Ferdinand the Bull (1939) is "not necessarily gay, but it's definitely queer". The short film depicts a "sleepy eyed bull who doesn't conform to expectations of masculinity". Nico Lang of Harper's Bazaar said Disney's 1941 film The Reluctant Dragon "is extremely queer, even if it's not necessarily gay". He also noted the inclusion of a gay couple (two male antelopes) in Zootopia. Lang wrote, "in 1937, a group of lesbians in Chicago threw a series of bashes known as 'Mickey Mouse's parties.' These gatherings for like-minded ladies were a reference to the fact that 'Mickey Mouse' was a common term at the time for gay men", according to Griffin.

Notes

See also 

 List of animated series with LGBT characters
 History of LGBT anime
 List of animated series with crossdressing characters
 List of anime by release date (1946–1959)
 List of animated films with LGBT characters
 Cross-dressing in film and television
 List of LGBT-related films by year
 History of homosexuality in American film
 List of yuri anime and manga
 List of yuri works
 List of yaoi anime and manga

References

Citations

Sources

Further reading

External links 
 GLAAD Media Institute which tracks LGBTQ (and other) representation in U.S. television shows, including animated ones
 Blog of GLAAD which focuses on LGBTQ representation
 Animation news from LGBTQ Nation

1960s animated television series
1970s animated television series
1980s animated television series
1990s animated television series
2000s animated television series
2010s animated television series
LGBT portrayals in mass media
 
History of animation
LGBT history